Have You Seen This Ghost? is the tenth official studio album from Sopor Aeternus & the Ensemble of Shadows and the second part of the trilogy A Triptychon of GHOSTS (or El Sexorcismo de Anna-Varney Cantodea), which includes the EPs A Strange Thing to Say and Children of the Corn.

The album was first released in April 2011 in two different forms. One of which was a 128-page hardcover book format (limited to 1999 copies) which contained the album and a DVD for the music video of "It Is Safe To Sleep Alone." The other, a 2-LP vinyl (limited to 693 copies) on purple colored wax. Both limited editions are signed and numbered by Anna-Varney Contodea herself. The standard jewel Case Edition was released in August 2011.

Track listing

Personnel 
Sopor Aeternus
 Anna-Varney Cantodea: vocals, all other instruments, programming, mixing

Additional musicians
 Thomas Haug: violin
 Tim Ströble: cello
 Fenton Bragg: trombone
 Wayne Coer: trumpet
 Eugene de la Fontaine: tuba
 Uta Ferson: clarinet
 Benjamin Dover: oboe
 Eric Chen: bassoon
 Olegg Mancovicz: balalaika, banjo
 Burt Eerie: drums
 Terence Bat: drums
 Patrick Damiani: recording, mixing, engineering

Notes

2011 albums
Sopor Aeternus and The Ensemble of Shadows albums